The third government of Felipe González was formed on 7 December 1989, following the latter's election as Prime Minister of Spain by the Congress of Deputies on 5 December and his swearing-in on 6 December, as a result of the Spanish Socialist Workers' Party (PSOE) emerging as the largest parliamentary force at the 1989 Spanish general election.

González formed a continuity government, maintaining the same composition of the preceding cabinet as established in 1988. This came as a consequence of the pending legal challenges on election results in some constituencies sparking an apparent "provisionality feeling" on the new government, a situation which had already led to an unprecedented investiture session with 18 deputies being prevented by judicial courts from taking their offices. The government included two members of the Socialists' Party of Catalonia (PSC)—initially Narcís Serra, later joined by Jordi Solé Tura—and four independents (Claudio Aranzadi, Jorge Semprún and Rosa Conde—who would end up joining the PSOE in November 1990—as well as Pedro Solbes from March 1991).

The government was automatically dismissed on 7 June 1993 as a consequence of the 1993 general election, but remained in acting capacity until the next government was sworn in.

Investiture

Cabinet changes
González's third government saw a number of cabinet changes during its tenure:
On 19 April 1990, Minister of Labour and Social Security Manuel Chaves was nominated to lead the Spanish Socialist Workers' Party (PSOE) into the 1990 Andalusian regional election. This led to a limited cabinet reshuffle, seeing Luis Martínez Noval replacing Chaves in his ministry post on 2 May.
On 12 January 1991, Alfonso Guerra announced his resignation as Deputy Prime Minister of Spain, effective on 14 January, as a result of a financial scandal involving his brother Juan Guerra and which had been ongoing for over a year; but also after a stark erosion in the relationship with Prime Minister Felipe González had seen Guerra's standing in government weaken. González used the opportunity of Guerra's resignation to arrange a major cabinet reshuffle, which was materialized in March 1991. The reshuffle saw Narcís Serra becoming new Deputy Prime Minister; the incorporation of Tomás de la Quadra-Salcedo (Justice), Josep Borrell (Public Works and Transport), Pedro Solbes (Agriculture, Fisheries and Food), Juan Manuel Eguiagaray (Public Administrations), Jordi Solé Tura (Culture) and Julián García Valverde (Health and Consumer Affairs); the farewell of Enrique Múgica, Javier Sáenz de Cosculluela, Carlos Romero, Joaquín Almunia and Jorge Semprún; Julián García Vargas becoming new Minister of Defence succeeding Serra and the split up of José Barrionuevo's Transport, Tourism and Communications ministry between the Public Works and Industry departments. Of the new incorporations, Jordi Solé Tura was a member from the Socialists' Party of Catalonia (PSC) since 1988, whereas Pedro Solbes was an independent.
On 10 January 1992, Julián García Valverde submitted his resignation as Minister of Health and Consumer Affairs as a result of alleged embezzlement and tax fraud accusations during Valverde's time as president of Renfe between 1985 and 1991. Felipe González accepted Valverde's resignation on 13 January and appointed José Antonio Griñán as a replacement.
On 16 June 1992, Felipe González accepted Francisco Fernández Ordóñez's resignation as Minister of Foreign Affairs because of a deteriorating health resulting from the cancer affection he had been developing since 1988. Ordóñez had been on leave of absence since 31 May as a result of a physical impossibility to keep on his duties as minister, being replaced in his post by Javier Solana on 24 June; in turn, Solana was replaced in the Education portfolio by Alfredo Pérez Rubalcaba. Fernández Ordóñez died on 7 August 1992, only a month and a half after his resignation.

Council of Ministers
The Council of Ministers was structured into the offices for the prime minister, the deputy prime minister and 17 ministries, including the ministry for the spokesperson of the Government. The number of ministries was reduced to 16 after the Transport, Tourism and Communications portfolio was split and merged into the Public Works and Urbanism and Industry and Energy ministries in March 1991. The office of the deputy prime minister was left vacant from January to March 1991.

Departmental structure
Felipe González's third government was organised into several superior and governing units, whose number, powers and hierarchical structure varied depending on the ministerial department.

Unit/body rank
() Secretary of state
() Undersecretary
() Director-general
() Autonomous agency
() Military & intelligence agency

Notes

References

External links
Governments. Juan Carlos I (20.11.1975 ...). CCHS-CSIC (in Spanish).
Governments of Spain 1982–1996. Ministers of Felipe González. Historia Electoral.com (in Spanish).
The governments of the first period of the Spanish Socialist Workers' Party (1982–1996). Lluís Belenes i Rodríguez History Page (in Spanish).

1989 establishments in Spain
1993 disestablishments in Spain
Cabinets established in 1989
Cabinets disestablished in 1993
Council of Ministers (Spain)